Commercial art is the art of creative services, referring to art created for commercial purposes, primarily advertising. Commercial art uses a variety of platforms (magazines, websites, apps, television, etc.) for viewers with the intent of promoting sale and interest of products, services, and ideas. It relies on the iconic image (pictorial representations that are recognized easily to members of a culture) to enhance recall and favorable recognition for a product or service. An example of a product could be a magazine ad promoting a new soda through complementary colors, a catchy message, and appealing illustrative features. Another example could be promoting the prevention of global warming by encouraging people to walk or ride a bike instead of driving in an eye catching poster. It communicates something specific to an audience.

People can obtain training, certifications, and degrees that incorporate commercial arts in many exercises, activities, and programs.

Skills 
Commercial artists have the ability to organize information and knowledge of fine arts, visualization and media in a way to reach an audience's attention. Some of these skills may include the following:

 Attention to detail
 Ability to communicate effectively
 Experience or skills in the fine arts (drawing, painting, photography, etc.)
 Knowledgeable of certain computer software programs (graphics, editing, etc.) and ability to use them
 Marketing skills
 Advertising skills
 Coordination skills
 Animation skills

Genres
Commercial art can include many genres of art and categories of art technique, including:

 Commercial character design
 Illustration
 Graphic design
Industrial design
 Motion graphic design
 Photography
 Television commercials
 Music videos
 Animation
 Computer art
 Fashion designer
 Store art
 Decorative 
 Ornamental

Consumerism within commercial art 
Commercial art is art that is created for commercial purposes to promote services, products, and ideas to viewers. In the process of creating commercial art, an audience is taken into consideration when designing and/or forming the goods that are being advertised/promoted. An example of this can be seen in the recognized works of American painter and consumer ad designer, Andy Warhol. Using Campbell's soup and Coca-Cola bottles as everyday products of consumers, he recreated a visually stimulating design through pop art that advertises the products through consumption habits of consumers. Consumerism was present when pop art was popular. Pop art could contain mass cultural objects and/or celebrities (popular culture and mass media) to endorse markets and goods.

References

Visual arts genres
Communication design
Graphic design